The Bear River is a tributary of the Feather River in the Sierra Nevada, winding through four California counties:  Yuba, Sutter, Placer, and Nevada.

The California Office of Environmental Health Hazard Assessment has issued a safe advisory for any fish caught in Bear River due to elevated levels of mercury.

Geography

The Bear River originates at Emigrant Gap, as a tiny stream on the border of Nevada and Placer Counties in the Tahoe National Forest. The headwaters are on a ridge immediately to the south of the South Yuba River and north of the North Fork American River. The river flows west into the Bear Valley then enters a deep and narrow gorge, passing the community of Dutch Flat. While part of the reservoir, the river is joined by Greenhorn Creek from the north.

Below the dam the river flows southwest through the Sierra foothills, past Colfax and Meadow Vista, through Lake Combie and a short but rugged gorge above Garden Bar. Shortly downstream it widens into Camp Far West Reservoir, where it begins to define the Placer–Yuba County border. Further west it flows into the Sacramento Valley where it forms a large alluvial floodplain. Starting at Wheatland it forms the border of Yuba and Sutter Counties.

Because the Bear River watershed is at a relatively low elevation compared to other Sierra streams, rainfall, not snowmelt, is the main source of runoff. The flow rate is also heavily influenced by numerous dams and diversions on the river.

Geology
The Bear River is considered an underfit stream, as a much larger, snow-fed river flowed through its channel in ancient times. Millions of years ago the upper part of the South Yuba River (above Lake Spaulding) flowed into the Bear River at Emigrant Gap.

History

The Bear River area has long been home to the Nisenan people. 

Its basin is in California's Gold Country and was one of the richest areas of the 19th century California Gold Rush. Major mining sites in the Bear River basin included You Bet, Red Dog, Dutch Flat, Gold Run, Waloupa, Little York, and Chalk Bluff.

Large amounts of land in the Bear River drainage were radically altered by hydraulic mining. At You Bet and Red Dog  of gold-bearing gravel was washed out; at Dutch Flat ; and at Gold Run .

Engineering
The Bear River has been significantly dammed and diverted for irrigation, domestic water supply, and hydropower generation. The river flow has been greatly augmented via diversions from the larger Yuba River basin to the north, via the Drum-Spaulding Hydroelectric Project and Yuba-Bear Hydroelectric Project. The former, completed in the 1910s primarily for hydropower generation is owned by PG&E; the latter was built in the 1960s by the Nevada Irrigation District (NID). Although nominally two separate projects, the complex system of some 40 reservoirs in the Middle and South Forks of the Yuba and on the upper Bear River is heavily interconnected, and operated as one.

About  of water from the Yuba River Basin enters the Bear River Basin via the Drum Canal, which is fed by a tunnel from Lake Spaulding. The uppermost dams on the Bear River are at Dutch Flat Forebay and Dutch Flat Afterbay, both small hydroelectric diversion dams. Water from the upper Bear River and the Drum Canal pass through these dams and drive powerhouses at Drum, Dutch Flat and Chicago Park.

Below Chicago Park Powerhouse, at the confluence of Greenhorn Creek, the Bear River is impounded by Rollins Dam, which forms a  reservoir. The reservoir stores water for irrigation and hydroelectricity, and serves the important purpose of trapping sediment from early hydraulic mining activity in the upper Bear River basin. Excess water from the canal enters the American River basin via a powerhouse at Folsom Lake.

The Van Giesen Dam, which forms the lake, is the oldest dam on the Bear River proper, completed in 1928. The reservoir provides for both flood control and irrigation in the lower valley of the Bear River. About 80 percent of the South Sutter irrigation district is planted with rice.

Dam proposals
In July 2011, a dam project for the Bear River was revealed to be under study by a consortium of out of area water districts.  The South Sutter Water District (Trowbridge), along with the cities of Napa, American Canyon, and Palmdale, the Castaic Lake Water Agency, and the San Bernardino Valley Municipal Water District, issued a preliminary study on siting a new dam north of the present Camp Far West Reservoir and south of Combie and Rollins reservoirs farther upstream. The dam would be in the NID (Nevada Irrigation District) water district and would flood portions of Nevada County and Placer County.  The proposed Garden Bar Dam would be located in areas already set aside as conservation and wildlife areas, and the resulting lake would inundate prime wildlife habitat and oak and savannah grasslands.

Because of concerns that the water that would fill the proposed large reservoir (according to the study, the largest option would be ) is already allocated for existing impoundment lakes by dams on the Bear River at Camp Far West, Combie, and Rollins, the actual feasibility of the project seems speculative, and has raised doubts as to the actual purpose of the proposal.

A quote from the study says "Water Availability: The report acknowledges the existence of "numerous issues that would need to be resolved to confirm the availability of this water and the ability to convey a portion of it through the Delta, if so desired."

Due to poor economic justifications and opposition from the conservation group, Sierra Watch, local land trusts, ranchers, and the board of supervisors of both Placer and Nevada Counties, the water district dropped the proposed Garden Bar Dam in July 2012.

In 2014, the NID put forth another plan for a new dam/reservoir on the Bear River at the Parker site, located just above Lake Combie. The "Save the Bear, Stop Centennial" campaign was created in opposition to the proposal by non-profit environmental organizations, the Foothills Water Network and South Yuba River Citizens League (SYRCL), with the support of other community and conservation groups such as Sierra Watch.

See also
List of rivers of California

References

Rivers of the Sierra Nevada in California
Rivers of the Sierra Nevada in Nevada
Tributaries of the Feather River
Rivers of Sutter County, California
Rivers of Yuba County, California
Rivers of Placer County, California
Rivers of Nevada County, California
Tahoe National Forest
Rivers of Northern California
Rivers of the Sierra Nevada (United States)